Rogério "Jerry" Pereira (born 14 December 1965) is a former Brazilian footballer who is currently a football agent.

Career

Pereira made a name for himself in the top Bulgarian league, where he donned the colours of Slavia Sofia, Shumen and Belasitsa Petrich in the 1990s. Pereira is believed to be the first Brazilian to play in the highest division of Bulgaria. After his retirement, he became a football agent, representing many Brazilian footballers.

References

Living people
1965 births
Brazilian footballers
Association football defenders
PFC Slavia Sofia players
FC Lokomotiv 1929 Sofia players
PFC Belasitsa Petrich players
First Professional Football League (Bulgaria) players
Expatriate footballers in Bulgaria
Brazilian expatriate sportspeople in Bulgaria